Two referendums were held in Switzerland during 1928. The first was held on 20 May, asking voters whether they approved of amending article 44 of the constitution regarding measures against foreign infiltrators, and was approved by a majority of voters and cantons. The second was held on 2 December, asking voters whether they approved of the "Kursaalspiele" popular initiative on gambling, and was also approved.

Background
The constitutional question was a mandatory referendum, which required a double majority; a majority of the popular vote and majority of the cantons. The decision of each canton was based on the vote in that canton. Full cantons counted as one vote, whilst half cantons counted as half. The gambling question was a "popular initiative", which also required a double majority.

Results

Constitutional amendment

Gambling initiative

References

1928 referendums
1928 in Switzerland
Referendums in Switzerland